Pier Giorgio Dall'Acqua (Mercato Saraceno, 14 April 1949) is an Italian politician who served as president of the Province of Ferrara from 1999 to 2009.

References

External links
 Official website for Ferrara and its Province (archive)

1949 births
Living people
Democracy is Freedom – The Daisy politicians
21st-century Italian politicians
Presidents of the Province of Ferrara